71P/Clark is a periodic comet in the Solar System with an orbital period of 5.5 years.

It was discovered by Michael Clark at Mount John University Observatory, New Zealand on 9 June 1973 with a brightness of apparent magnitude 13.  Subsequently it has been observed in 1978, 1984, 1989, 1995, 2000, 2006, 2011 and 2017.

See also
 List of numbered comets

References

External links 
 Orbital simulation from JPL (Java) / Horizons Ephemeris
 71P/Clark – Seiichi Yoshida @ aerith.net

Periodic comets
0071
Comets in 2011
Comets in 2017
19730609